August Gustav Heinrich von Bongard (12 September 1786 – 1839) was a German botanist who worked in Saint Petersburg, Russia.

Born in Bonn, he was among the first botanists to describe the new plants then being discovered in Alaska (under Russian ownership at the time), including species now of major commercial importance like Sitka Spruce and Red Alder. The specimens he described were mostly collected by Carl Mertens at Sitka, Alaska.

The plant genus Bongardia (family Berberidaceae) is named in his honor.

Selected writings 
 Observations sur la végétation de l'ile de Sitcha, 1833
 Esquisse historique des travaux sur la botanique entrepris en Russie depuis, 1834
 Genera plantarum ad familias suas redacta (with Carl Bernhard von Trinius), 1835.
 "Historical Sketch of the Progress of Botany in Russia from the Time of Peter the Great to the Present Day", (translated from the "Recueil Des Actes de Pétersbourg de 1834"); Curtis's Botanical Magazine. Companion to the Botanical Magazine ... By W.J. Hooker. Vol. 1. pp. 117–186, (1836)
 Plantae quatuor brasilienses novae (with Carl Bernhard von Trinius), 1839.
 Verzeichniß der im Jahre 1838 am Saisang-Nor und am Irtysch gesammelten Pflanzen, A second supplement to "Flora Altaica" (with Carl Anton von Meyer and Karl Friedrich von Ledebour), 1841.

References

 This article incorporates text based on a translation of an equivalent article at the German Wikipedia, listed as: Robert Zander, Fritz Encke, Günther Buchheim, Siegmund Seybold (eds.): Handbook of Plant Names . 13th Edition. Ulmer Verlag, Stuttgart 1984,

External links 
 IPNI List of plants described and co-described by Bongard.

19th-century German botanists
Botanists active in North America
Full members of the Saint Petersburg Academy of Sciences
Pteridologists
1786 births
1839 deaths